A pendulum saw or swing saw is a mechanically powered circular saw with the blade mounted so it can swing into the material.

Operation
A swing saw is used for cross cutting wood in a sawmill, or for cutting ice off of a frozen body of waters. The saw is hung on a swinging arm, sometimes with a counterbalance weight. 

A swing saw is also sometimes called a cut-off trim saw in a mill for cutting right angle to the direction of the wood grain. A swing saw is a very dangerous tool, even with a blade guard. Early models were driven by a belt, usually made of leather, that was powered by a water mill or later a steam engine. Today the power source is an electric motor or a gas engine

Harbin International Ice and Snow Sculpture Festival
Swing saws are used to carve ice blocks from the frozen Songhua River for the Harbin International Ice and Snow Sculpture Festival each year.

See also 
 Saw chain
 Saw pit
 Sharpening
 Two-man saw
 Watersaw
 Diamond tools
 Ice hotel
 Ice palace

References

External links
osha.gov use of Swing Saw
btsrr.com Model of a Swing Saw
americanartifacts.com homemade Swing Saw
flickr.com Swing Saw plans
westernscalemodels.com Cut-Off Trim Saw model
chestofbooks.com early Pendulum saw, not circular
The Encyclopædia Britannica: a dictionary of arts, sciences, Volume 29, page 12 gbook, Pendulum saw

Cutting machines
Saws
Woodworking machines